Ahamed is a surname. Notable people with the surname include:

E. Ahamed, Indian politician
Emajuddin Ahamed (1933–2020), Bangladeshi academic
Liaquat Ahamed, American writer
M.C. Ahamed (died 2008), Sri Lankan politician
Mohammed Ahamed (born 1985), Norwegian-Somali footballer
Salim Ahamed (born 1970), Indian film director, producer and screenwriter